Khristo Khristov (2 January 1935 – 10 July 2015) was a Bulgarian athlete. He competed in the men's pole vault at the 1960 Summer Olympics.

References

External links
 

1935 births
2015 deaths
Athletes (track and field) at the 1960 Summer Olympics
Bulgarian male pole vaulters
Olympic athletes of Bulgaria
Place of birth missing